Stenaelurillus albus is  a jumping spider species in the genus Stenaelurillus that lives in India. It was first described in 2015. The spider is of medium size. Similarly, the female has yellow bands on the cephalothorax and thorax, while on the male the bands are white. The opisthosoma in both is plain black, which distinguishes the species from others in the genus.

References

Spiders described in 2015
Salticidae
Spiders of the Indian subcontinent